Quetigny is a commune in the Côte-d'Or department in eastern France.

Geography

Climate
Quetigny has a oceanic climate (Köppen climate classification Cfb).

Population

Sister cities
 Bous, Germany
 Koulikoro, Mali

See also
Communes of the Côte-d'Or department

References

Communes of Côte-d'Or